

Events

Pre-1600
97 – Roman emperor Nerva is forced by the Praetorian Guard to adopt general Marcus Ulpius Trajanus as his heir and successor.
 306 – Maxentius is proclaimed Roman emperor.
 312 – Constantine I defeats Maxentius, becoming the sole Roman emperor in the West.
 969 – The Byzantine Empire recovers Antioch from Arab rule.
1344 – The lower town of Smyrna is captured by Crusaders in response to Aydınid piracy.
1420 – Beijing is officially designated the capital of the Ming dynasty when the Forbidden City is completed.
1449 – Christian I is crowned king of Denmark.
1453 – Ladislaus the Posthumous is crowned king of Bohemia in Prague.
1492 – Christopher Columbus lands in Cuba on his first voyage to the New World, surmising that it is Japan. 
1516 – Second Ottoman–Mamluk War: Mamluks fail to stop the Ottoman advance towards Egypt at the Battle of Yaunis Khan.
1520 – Ferdinand Magellan reaches the Pacific Ocean.
1531 – Abyssinian–Adal war: The Adal Sultanate seizes southern Ethiopia.
1538 – The Universidad Santo Tomás de Aquino is founded in what is now the Dominican Republic.

1601–1900
1628 – French Wars of Religion: The Siege of La Rochelle ends with the surrender of the Huguenots after fourteen months.
1636 – The Massachusetts Bay Colony votes to establish a theological college, which would later become Harvard University.
1664 – The Duke of York and Albany's Maritime Regiment of Foot, later to be known as the Royal Marines, is established.
1707 – The 1707 Hōei earthquake causes more than 5,000 deaths in Japan.
1726 – The novel Gulliver's Travels written by Jonathan Swift is published.
1776 – American Revolutionary War: British troops attack and capture Chatterton Hill from the Continental Army.
1834 – The Pinjarra massacre occurs in the Swan River Colony. An estimated 30 Noongar people are killed by British colonists.
1835 – The United Tribes of New Zealand are established with the signature of the Declaration of Independence.
1864 – American Civil War: A Union attack on the Confederate capital of Richmond is repulsed.
1886 – US president Grover Cleveland dedicates the Statue of Liberty.
1891 – The Mino–Owari earthquake, the largest inland earthquake in Japan's history, occurs.
1893 – Pyotr Tchaikovsky's Symphony No. 6 in B Minor, Pathétique receives its première performance only nine days before the composer's death.

1901–present
1918 – World War I: A new Polish government in western Galicia is established, triggering the Polish–Ukrainian War.
  1918   – World War I: Czech politicians peacefully take over the city of Prague, thus establishing the First Czechoslovak Republic.
1919 – The U.S. Congress passes the Volstead Act over President Woodrow Wilson's veto, paving the way for Prohibition to begin the following January.
1922 – Italian fascists led by Benito Mussolini march on Rome and take over the Italian government.
1928 – Indonesia Raya, now the national anthem of Indonesia, is first played during the Second Indonesian Youth Congress.
1940 – World War II: Greece rejects Italy's ultimatum. Italy invades Greece through Albania a few hours later.
1942 – The Alaska Highway first connects Alaska to the North American railway network at Dawson Creek in Canada.
1948 – Paul Hermann Müller is awarded the Nobel Prize in Physiology or Medicine for his discovery of the insecticidal properties of DDT.
1949 – An Air France Lockheed Constellation crashes in the Azores, killing all 48 people on board.
1956 – Hungarian Revolution: A de facto ceasefire comes into effect between armed revolutionaries and Soviet troops, who begin to withdraw from Budapest. Communist officials and facilities come under attack by revolutionaries. 
1958 – John XXIII is elected Pope.
1962 – The Cuban Missile Crisis ends and Premier Nikita Khrushchev orders the removal of Soviet missiles from Cuba.
1965 – Pope Paul VI promulgates Nostra aetate, by which the Roman Catholic Church officially recognizes the legitimacy of non-Christian faiths.
1971 – Prospero becomes the only British satellite to be launched by a British rocket.
1982 – The Spanish general election begins fourteen years of rule by the Spanish Socialist Workers' Party.
1990 – Georgia holds its only free election under Soviet rule.
1995 – The Baku Metro fire sees 289 people killed and 270 injured.
2006 – A funeral service takes place at the Bykivnia graves for Ukrainians who were killed by the Soviet secret police.
2007 – Cristina Fernández de Kirchner becomes the first directly elected female President of Argentina.
2009 – The 28 October 2009 Peshawar bombing kills 117 and wounds 213.
  2009   – NASA successfully launches the Ares I-X mission, the only rocket launch for its short-lived Constellation program.
  2009   – US President Barack Obama signs the Matthew Shepard and James Byrd Jr. Hate Crimes Prevention Act.
2013 – Five people are killed and 38 are injured after a car crashes into barriers at Tiananmen Square in China.
2014 – A rocket carrying NASA's Cygnus CRS Orb-3 resupply mission to the International Space Station explodes seconds after taking off from the Mid-Atlantic Regional Spaceport in Wallops Island, Virginia.
2018 – Jair Bolsonaro is elected president of Brazil with 57 million votes, with Workers' Party candidate Fernando Haddad as the runner-up. It is the first time in 16 years that a Workers' Party candidate is not elected president.

Births

Pre-1600
1017 – Henry III, Holy Roman Emperor (d. 1056)
1466 – Erasmus, Dutch philosopher (d. 1536)
1479 – John Gage, English courtier (d. 1556)
1510 – Francis Borgia, 4th Duke of Gandía, Spanish priest and saint, 3rd Superior General of the Society of Jesus (d. 1572)
1550 – Stanislaus Kostka, Polish saint (d. 1568)
1585 – Cornelius Jansen, Dutch bishop and theologian (d. 1638)
1599 – Marie of the Incarnation, foundress of the Ursuline Monastery in Quebec (d. 1672)

1601–1900
1610 – Jacob Kettler, 3rd duke of Courland and Semigallia (d. 1682)
1667 – Maria Anna of Neuburg, Queen consort of Spain
1690 – Peter Tordenskjold, Norwegian admiral (d. 1720)
1693 – Šimon Brixi, Czech composer (d. 1735)
1696 – Maurice de Saxe, French general (d. 1750)
1703 – Antoine Deparcieux, French mathematician and engineer (d. 1768)
1718 – Ignacije Szentmartony, Croatian priest, mathematician, astronomer, and explorer (d. 1793)
1733 – Franz Ignaz von Beecke, German composer (d. 1803)
1754 – John Laurens, American soldier (d. 1782)
1767 – Marie of Hesse-Kassel (d. 1852)
1793 – Eliphalet Remington, American businessman, founded Remington Arms (d. 1861)
1794 – Robert Liston, Scottish surgeon (d. 1847)
1804 – Pierre François Verhulst, Belgian mathematician and theorist (d. 1849)
1815 – Ľudovít Štúr, Slovak philologist and politician (d. 1856)
1816 – Malwida von Meysenbug, German writer (d. 1903)
1837 – Tokugawa Yoshinobu, Japanese shōgun (d. 1913)
1839 – Edward P. Allen, American captain, lawyer, and politician (d. 1909)
1845 – Zygmunt Florenty Wróblewski, Polish physicist and chemist (d. 1888)
1846 – Auguste Escoffier, French chef and author (d. 1935)
1854 – Jean-Marie Guyau, French philosopher and poet (d. 1888)
1860 – Kanō Jigorō, Japanese martial artist (d. 1938)
1864 – Adolfo Camarillo, Mexican-American rancher and philanthropist (d. 1958)
1867 – Sister Nivedita, Irish-Indian nurse, author, and educator (d. 1911)
1875 – Gilbert Hovey Grosvenor, Turkish-Canadian journalist (d. 1966)
1877 – Joe Adams, American baseball player and manager (d. 1952)
1879 – Channing H. Cox, American lawyer and politician, 49th Governor of Massachusetts (d. 1968)
1880 – Wilhelm Anderson, Belarusian-Estonian astrophysicist and astronomer (d. 1940)
  1880   – Billy Wedlock, English footballer (d. 1965)
1881 – Vin Coutie, Australian footballer (d. 1951)
1884 – William Douglas Cook, New Zealand horticulturalist, founded Eastwoodhill Arboretum (d. 1967)
1885 – Velimir Khlebnikov, Russian poet and playwright (d. 1922)
1886 – Noel Macklin, English soldier and engineer (d. 1946)
1888 – Christopher Vane, 10th Baron Barnard, English soldier and politician, Lord Lieutenant of Durham (d. 1964)
1889 – Juliette Béliveau, Canadian actress and singer (d. 1975)
1892 – Dink Johnson, American pianist, drummer, and clarinet player (d. 1954)
1893 – Christopher Kelk Ingold, British chemist (d. 1970)
1896 – Howard Hanson, American composer, conductor, and educator (d. 1981)
1897 – Edith Head, American costume designer (d. 1981)
  1897   – Hans Speidel, German general (d. 1984)

1901–present
1901 – Eileen Shanahan, Irish poet (d. 1979)
1902 – Elsa Lanchester, English-American actress and singer (d. 1986)
1903 – John Chamberlain, American historian, journalist, and critic (d. 1995)
  1903   – Evelyn Waugh, English journalist, author, and critic (d. 1966)
1904 – George Dangerfield, English-American historian, journalist, and author (d. 1986)
1905 – Tatyana Pavlovna Ehrenfest, Dutch mathematician (d. 1984)
1907 – John Hewitt, Irish poet, playwright, and critic (d. 1987)
1908 – Arturo Frondizi, Argentinian lawyer and politician, 32nd President of Argentina (d. 1995)
1909 – Francis Bacon, Irish painter and illustrator (d. 1992)
1912 – Richard Doll, English physiologist and epidemiologist (d. 2005)
1914 – Glenn Robert Davis, American lieutenant and politician (d. 1988)
  1914   – Jonas Salk, American biologist and physician (d. 1995)
  1914   – Richard Laurence Millington Synge, English biochemist and academic, Nobel Prize laureate (d. 1994)
1916 – Pearl Hackney, English actress (d. 2009)
1917 – Jack Soo, American actor and singer (d. 1979)
1919 – Walt Hansgen, American race car driver (d. 1966)
  1919   – Hans Klenk, German race car driver (d. 2009)
1921 – Azumafuji Kin'ichi, Japanese sumo wrestler, the 40th Yokozuna (d. 1973)
1922 – Gershon Kingsley, German-American pianist, composer, and conductor (d. 2019)
  1922   – Simon Muzenda, Zimbabwe politician, 1st Vice President of Zimbabwe (d. 2003)
  1922   – Butch van Breda Kolff, American basketball player and coach (d. 2007)
1923 – John Connell, American actor (d. 2015)
1924 – Antonio Creus, Spanish race car driver and motorcycle racer (d. 1996)
  1924   – Peddibhotla Suryakantam, Telugu actress (d. 1994)
1925 – Ian Hamilton Finlay, Bahamian-Scottish poet, sculptor, and gardener (d. 2006)
1926 – Bowie Kuhn, American lawyer and businessman (d. 2007)
1927 – Cleo Laine, English singer and actress
1928 – Ion Mihai Pacepa, Romanian general (d. 2021)
  1928   – William Rodgers, Baron Rodgers of Quarry Bank, English politician, Shadow Secretary of State for Defence
1929 – Marcel Bozzuffi, French actor, director, and screenwriter (d. 1988)
  1929   – Virginia Held, American philosopher, author, and academic
  1929   – John Hollander, American poet, critic, and educator (d. 2013)
  1929   – Joan Plowright, English actress
1930 – Bernie Ecclestone, English businessman
1931 – Harold Battiste, American saxophonist, pianist, and composer (d. 2015)
1932 – Spyros Kyprianou, Cypriot lawyer and politician, 2nd President of Cyprus (d. 2002)
  1932   – Suzy Parker, American model and actress (d. 2003)
1933 – Garrincha, Brazilian footballer (d. 1983)
  1933   – Michael Noakes, English painter and illustrator (d. 2018)
1934 – Charles A. Gargano, American diplomat, businessman and government official
1935 – Alan Clarke, English director and screenwriter (d. 1990)
1936 – Charlie Daniels, American singer-songwriter, fiddle-player and guitarist (d. 2020)
  1936   – Ted Hawkins, American soul-blues singer-songwriter and guitarist (d. 1995)
1937 – Graham Bond, English keyboard player, singer, and saxophonist (d. 1974)
  1937   – Lenny Wilkens, American basketball player and coach
1938 – Keigo Abe, Japanese martial artist and coach
  1938   – Kenneth Best, Liberian journalist, founded The Daily Observer
  1938   – Howard Blake, English composer and conductor
  1938   – Dave Budd, American basketball player
  1938   – Gary Cowan, Canadian golfer
  1938   – David Dimbleby, English journalist
  1938   – Anne Perry, English author
1939 – Jane Alexander, American actress and producer
  1939   – Andy Bey, American singer and pianist
  1939   – Miroslav Cerar, Slovenian gymnast and lawyer
  1939   – Curtis Lee, American singer-songwriter (d. 2015)
1940 – Susan Harris, American screenwriter and producer
1941 – Hank Marvin, English singer and guitarist
1942 – Terence Donovan, English-Australian actor
  1942   – Abdelkader Fréha, Algerian footballer (d. 2012)
  1942   – Kees Verkerk, Dutch speed skater
  1942   – Gillian Lovegrove, English computer scientist and academic
1943 – Jimmy McRae, Scottish race car driver
  1943   – Karalyn Patterson, English psychologist and academic
1944 – Gerry Anderson, Irish radio and television host (d. 2014)
  1944   – Coluche, French comedian and actor (d. 1986)
  1944   – Dennis Franz, American actor
  1944   – Anton Schlecker, German businessman, founded the Schlecker Company
1945 – Sandy Berger, American lawyer and politician, 19th United States National Security Advisor (d. 2015)
  1945   – Wayne Fontana, English pop singer (d. 2020)
  1945   – Don Iverson, American golfer
1946 – John Hewson, Australian economist and politician
  1946   – Wim Jansen, Dutch footballer and manager (d. 2022)
  1946   – Sharon Thesen, Canadian poet and academic
1948 – Telma Hopkins, American singer and actress 
1949 – Caitlyn Jenner, American decathlete and actress
1950 – Sihem Bensedrine, Tunisian journalist and activist
  1950   – Ludo Delcroix, Belgian cyclist
1951 – Peter Hitchens, English journalist and author
  1951   – Joe R. Lansdale, American martial artist and author
1952 – Annie Potts, American actress
1953 – Pierre Boivin, Canadian businessman
1955 – Bill Gates, American businessman and philanthropist, co-founded Microsoft
  1955   – Indra Nooyi, Indian-American businesswoman
1956 – Mahmoud Ahmadinejad, Iranian engineer and politician, 6th President of Iran
  1956   – Volker Zotz, Austrian philosopher, scholar, and author
1957 – Marian Bell, English economist and academic
  1957   – Stephen Morris, English drummer 
  1957   – Zach Wamp, American businessman and politician
1958 – Concha García Campoy, Spanish journalist (d. 2013)
  1958   – Ashok Chavan, Indian businessman and politician, 16th Chief Minister of Maharashtra
  1958   – William Reid, Scottish singer-songwriter and guitarist 
1959 – James Keelaghan, Canadian singer-songwriter and producer
  1959   – Toshio Masuda, Japanese composer
  1959   – Randy Wittman, American basketball player and coach
1960 – Landon Curt Noll, American computer scientist and mathematician
1962 – Erik Thorstvedt, Norwegian footballer and manager
  1962   – Daphne Zuniga, American actress
1963 – Lauren Holly, American actress 
  1963   – Sheryl Underwood, American comedian, actress, and talk show host
1964 – Andrew Bridgen, English soldier and politician
  1964   – Peter Coyne, Australian rugby league player
1965 – Jami Gertz, American actress 
  1965   – David Warburton, English composer, businessman, and politician
  1965   – Miyako Yoshida, Japanese ballerina
1966 – Steve Atwater, American football player
  1966   – Matt Drudge, American blogger and activist, founded the Drudge Report
  1966   – Andy Richter, American actor, producer, and screenwriter
  1966   – Aris Spiliotopoulos, Greek politician, Greek Minister of Education and Religious Affairs
1967 – Kevin Macdonald, Scottish director, producer, and screenwriter
  1967   – Julia Roberts, American actress and producer
  1967   – John Romero, American video game designer, co-founded Id Software
1968 – Chris Broussard, American journalist and sportscaster
  1968   – Marc Lièvremont, French rugby player and coach
  1968   – Mayumi Ozaki, Japanese wrestler
1969 – Javier Grillo-Marxuach, Puerto Rican-American screenwriter and producer
  1969   – Ben Harper, American singer-songwriter and guitarist 
  1969   – Noriyoshi Omichi, Japanese baseball player and coach
 1969 – Steven Chamuleau, Dutch cardiologist
1970 – Greg Eagles, American voice actor and producer
  1970   – Alan Peter Cayetano, Filipino politician and Secretary of Foreign Affairs of the Philippines
1971 – Roxana Briban, Romanian soprano and actress (d. 2010)
  1971   – Caroline Dinenage, English businesswoman and politician
1972 – Terrell Davis, American football player and sportscaster
  1972   – Brad Paisley, American singer-songwriter, guitarist, and actor
  1972   – Trista Sutter, American reality star
1973 – Montel Vontavious Porter, American wrestler and actor
  1973   – Aleksandar Stanojević, Serbian footballer and manager
1974 – Braden Looper, American baseball player
  1974   – Vicente Moreno, Spanish footballer and manager
  1974   – Joaquin Phoenix, American actor and producer
  1974   – Dejan Stefanović, Serbian footballer and coach
  1974   – Dayanara Torres, Puerto Rican actress and singer, Miss Universe 1993
1976 – Keiron Cunningham, British rugby league player and coach
  1976   – Martin Lepa, Estonian footballer
  1976   – Simone Loria, Italian footballer
1978 – Justin Guarini, American singer-songwriter and actor
1979 – Natina Reed, American rapper and actress (d. 2012)
  1979   – Martin Škoula, Czech ice hockey player
  1979   – Olcay Çetinkaya, Turkish footballer
  1979   – Jawed Karim, American computer scientist
1980 – Christy Hemme, American wrestler and ring announcer
  1980   – Agnes Obel, Danish singer-songwriter and pianist
  1980   – Alan Smith, English footballer and coach
  1981   – Milan Baroš, Czech footballer
  1981   – Shane Gore, English footballer
  1981   – Nate McLouth, American baseball player
  1981   – Nick Montgomery, English-Scottish footballer
1982 – Jeremy Bonderman, American baseball player
  1982   – Enver Jääger, Estonian footballer
  1982   – Anthony Lerew, American baseball player
  1982   – Hironori Saruta, Japanese footballer
  1982   – Matt Smith, English actor and director
1983 – Jarrett Jack, American basketball player
  1983   – Kayo Noro, Japanese singer and actress 
  1983   – Joe Thomas, English actor and screenwriter
1984 – Bryn Evans, New Zealand rugby player
  1984   – Obafemi Martins, Nigerian footballer
  1984   – Finn Wittrock, American actor
1985 – Tyrone Barnett, English footballer
  1985   – Anthony Fantano, American music critic
1986 – May Calamawy, Egyptian-Palestinian actress
  1986   – Isabelle Eriksson, Swedish athlete
  1986   – Anthony Griffith, English footballer
  1986   – Aki Toyosaki, Japanese voice actress and singer
1987 – Frank Ocean, American singer-songwriter
1988 – Edd Gould, English cartoonist and animator (d. 2012)
  1988   – Jamie xx, English musician, DJ, record producer and remixer
1989 – Camille Muffat, French swimmer (d. 2015)
1991 – Lucy Bronze, English footballer
1992 – Maria Sergejeva, Estonian figure skater
  1992   – Jeon Ji-hee, South Korean table tennis player
1995 – Glen Kamara, Finnish footballer
1996 – Jasmine Jessica Anthony, American actress
  1996   – Jack Eichel, American ice hockey player
  1996   – Una Raymond-Hoey, Irish cricketer
1997 – Taylor Fritz, American tennis player
  1997   – Georgia Godwin, Australian artistic gymnast
1998 – Nolan Gould, American actor
2001 – Sonay Kartal, British tennis player

Deaths

Pre-1600
 312 – Maxentius, Roman emperor (b. 278)
 457 – Ibas of Edessa, Syrian bishop
 816 – Beggo, count of Toulouse and Paris
 875 – Remigius of Lyon, Frankish archbishop
1138 – King Bolesław III Wrymouth of Poland
1225 – Jien, Japanese monk, historian, and poet (b. 1155)
1266 – Saint Arsenije I Sremac
1310 – Ecumenical Patriarch Athanasius I of Constantinople (b. 1230)
1312 – Elizabeth of Carinthia, Queen of Germany (b. 1262)
1412 – Margaret I of Denmark (b. 1353)
1468 – Bianca Maria Visconti, Duchess of Milan (b. 1425)
1568 – Ashikaga Yoshihide, Japanese shōgun (b. 1539)
1592 – Ogier Ghiselin de Busbecq, Flemish diplomat
1594 – Ōkubo Tadayo, Japanese general (b. 1532)

1601–1900
1627 – Jahangir, Mughal Emperor of India (b. 1569)
1639 – Stefano Landi, Italian composer and educator (b. 1587)
1646 – William Dobson, English painter (b. 1610)
1661 – Agustín Moreto y Cavana, Spanish priest and playwright (b. 1618)
1676 – Jean Desmarets, French author, poet, and playwright (b. 1595)
1703 – John Wallis, English mathematician and cryptographer (b. 1616)
1704 – John Locke, English physician and philosopher (b. 1632)
1708 – Prince George of Denmark (b. 1653)
1716 – Stephen Fox, English politician (b. 1627)
1740 – Anna of Russia (b. 1693)
1754 – Friedrich von Hagedorn, German poet (b. 1708)
1755 – Joseph Bodin de Boismortier, French composer (b. 1689)
1763 – Heinrich von Brühl, German general and politician (b. 1700)
1768 – Michel Blavet, French flute player and composer (b. 1700)
1787 – Johann Karl August Musäus, German author (b. 1735)
1792 – Paul Möhring, German physician, botanist, and zoologist (b. 1710)
  1792   – John Smeaton, English engineer, designed the Coldstream Bridge and Perth Bridge (b. 1724)
1800 – Artemas Ward, American general and politician (b. 1727)
1806 – Charlotte Turner Smith, English poet and author (b. 1749)
1818 – Abigail Adams, American writer and second First Lady of the United States (b. 1744)
1841 – Johan August Arfwedson, Swedish chemist and academic (b. 1792)
1857 – Louis-Eugène Cavaignac, French general and politician, 26th Prime Minister of France (b. 1802)
1877 – Robert Swinhoe, English ornithologist and entomologist (b. 1835)
1879 – Marie Roch Louis Reybaud, French economist and politician (b. 1799)
1899 – Ottmar Mergenthaler, German-American engineer, invented the Linotype machine (b. 1854)
1900 – Max Müller, German philologist and orientalist (b. 1823)

1901–present
1906 – Jean Benner, French artist (b. 1836)
1914 – Richard Heuberger, Austrian composer and critic (b. 1850)
1916 – Cleveland Abbe, American meteorologist and academic (b. 1838)
  1916   – Oswald Boelcke, German WWI flying ace (b. 1891)
1917 – Prince Christian of Schleswig-Holstein (b. 1831)
  1917   – Dimitrios Votsis, Greek lawyer and politician (b. 1841)
1918 – Ulisse Dini, Italian mathematician and politician (b. 1845)
1929 – Bernhard von Bülow, German soldier and politician, Chancellor of Germany (b. 1849)
1936 – Newton Moore, Australian soldier and politician, 8th Premier of Western Australia (b. 1870) 
1939 – Alice Brady, American actress (b. 1892)
1941 – Filipp Goloshchyokin, Soviet politician (b. 1876)
1945 – Kesago Nakajima, Japanese general (b. 1881)
1952 – Billy Hughes, English-Australian politician, 7th Prime Minister of Australia (b. 1862)
1957 – Ernst Gräfenberg, German-American physician and gynecologist (b. 1881)
1959 – Camilo Cienfuegos, Cuban soldier (b. 1932)
1963 – Mart Saar, Estonian organist and composer (b. 1882)
1965 – Thomas Graham Brown, Scottish mountaineer and physiologist (b. 1882)
1969 – Constance Dowling, American model and actress (b. 1920)
1970 – Baby Huey, American singer-songwriter (b. 1944)
1973 – Taha Hussein, Egyptian historian, author, and academic (b. 1889)
  1973   – Sergio Tofano, Italian actor, director, and playwright (b. 1883)
1975 – Georges Carpentier, French boxer and actor (b. 1894)
  1975   – Oliver Nelson, American saxophonist, clarinet player, and composer (b. 1932)
1976 – Aarne Juutilainen, Finnish army captain (b. 1904)
1978 – Rukmani Devi, Sri Lankan singer and actress (b. 1923)
1983 – Otto Messmer, American animator and screenwriter (b. 1892)
1986 – John Braine, English author (b. 1922)
1987 – André Masson, French soldier and painter (b. 1896)
1989 – Henry Hall, English bandleader, composer, and actor (b. 1898)
1993 – Juri Lotman, Russian-Estonian historian and scholar (b. 1922)
1997 – Paul Jarrico, American screenwriter and producer (b. 1915)
1998 – Ted Hughes, English poet and playwright (b. 1930)
1999 – Antonios Katinaris, Greek singer-songwriter (b. 1931)
2000 – Andújar Cedeño, Dominican baseball player (b. 1969)
2001 – Gerard Hengeveld, Dutch pianist, composer, and educator (b. 1910)
2002 – Margaret Booth, American screenwriter and producer (b. 1898)
  2002   – Erling Persson, Swedish businessman, founded H&M (b. 1917)
2003 – Sally Baldwin, Scottish social sciences professor (b. 1940)
2004 – Eugene K. Bird, American colonel and author, US Commandant of Spandau Prison (b. 1926)
2005 – Bob Broeg, American soldier and journalist (b. 1918)
  2005   – Raymond Hains, French photographer (b. 1926)
  2005   – Tony Jackson, American basketball player (b. 1942)
  2005   – Fernando Quejas, Cape Verdean-Portuguese singer-songwriter (b. 1922)
  2005   – Richard Smalley, American chemist and academic, Nobel Prize laureate (b. 1943)
  2005   – Ljuba Tadić, Serbian actor and screenwriter (b. 1929)
2006 – Red Auerbach, American basketball player and coach (b. 1917)
  2006   – Trevor Berbick, Jamaican-Canadian boxer (b. 1954)
  2006   – Marijohn Wilkin, American guitarist and songwriter (b. 1920)
2007 – Takao Fujinami, Japanese lawyer and politician (b. 1932)
  2007   – Porter Wagoner, American singer-songwriter and guitarist (b. 1927)
2009 – Taylor Mitchell, Canadian singer-songwriter and guitarist (b. 1990)
2010 – Liang Congjie, Chinese historian and activist, founded Friends of Nature (b. 1932)
  2010   – James MacArthur, American actor (b. 1937)
  2010   – Jonathan Motzfeldt, Greenlandic politician, 1st Prime Minister of Greenland (b. 1938)
  2010   – Ehud Netzer, Israeli archaeologist, architect, and educator (b. 1934)
2011 – Tom Addington, English soldier (b. 1919)
2012 – Gordon Bilney, Australian dentist and politician (b. 1939)
  2012   – John Cheffers, Australian footballer and coach (b. 1936)
  2012   – Jack Dellal, English businessman (b. 1923)
2013 – Tetsuharu Kawakami, Japanese baseball player and manager (b. 1920)
  2013   – Tadeusz Mazowiecki, Polish journalist and politician, Prime Minister of Poland (b. 1927)
  2013   – Aleksandar Tijanić, Serbian journalist (b. 1949)
  2013   – Rajendra Yadav, Indian author (b. 1929)
2014 – Galway Kinnell, American poet and academic (b. 1927)
  2014   – Michael Sata, Zambian police officer and politician, 5th President of Zambia (b. 1937)
2018 – Colin Sylvia, Australian rules footballer (b. 1985)
2022 – Jerry Lee Lewis, American singer-songwriter and pianist (b. 1935)

Holidays and observances
Christian feast day:
Abdias of Babylon
Abgar V of Edessa (Eastern Orthodox Church)
Eadsige
Faro
Fidelis of Como (Roman Catholic Church)
Firmilian
Godwin of Stavelot
Job of Pochayiv (repose) (Eastern Orthodox Church)
The Apostles Simon and Jude (Western Christianity)
Lord of Miracles (Lima)
October 28 (Eastern Orthodox liturgics)
Day of the Establishment of an Independent Czecho-Slovak State, celebrates the independence of Czechoslovakia from Austria-Hungary in 1918. (Czech Republic and Slovakia)
International Animation Day (ASIFA)
Ohi Day (Greece, Cyprus and the Greek communities), a national day in Greece.
Prefectural Earthquake Disaster Prevention Day (Gifu Prefecture)
Youth Pledge Day or Hari Sumpah Pemuda (Indonesia)
Anniversary of the liberation of Ukraine from the Nazis, celebrating the liberation from Nazi German troops of the territory of current Ukraine

References

External links

 
 
 

Days of the year
October